Rudolf Dellenbach (born 20 May 1995) is a Hungarian badminton player who later represented Italy. He retired from the international competition in 2017, and starting a new career as a coach in Switzerland as well as a player in the team championships.

Achievements

BWF International Challenge/Series 
Men's singles

  BWF International Challenge tournament
  BWF International Series tournament
  BWF Future Series tournament

References

External links 
 

1995 births
Living people
Hungarian male badminton players
Hungarian expatriate sportspeople in Italy
Italian male badminton players
Hungarian expatriate sportspeople in Switzerland
Swiss people of Hungarian descent
Swiss male badminton players
Badminton coaches